Oswald Kaduk (26 August 1906 – 31 May 1997) was a German SS member during the Nazi era. He served as Rapportführer at the Auschwitz concentration camp.

Biography
The son of a blacksmith, Kaduk was born in Königshütte, Upper Silesia. After attending the Volksschule he trained as a butcher before becoming one in 1924. As well as working at the local slaughterhouse, Kaduk also held positions with fire fighting services at the municipal fire brigade in Chorzów and at a chemical plant.

World War II
In 1939 he joined the Allgemeine SS and in 1940 he was drafted into the Waffen-SS. He was sent to the Eastern Front, but due to various illnesses and stays at military hospitals he was posted to Auschwitz in 1941. At first he was assigned to watch tower duties in 1942, then became Blockführer and finally Rapportführer. One prisoner reported that he had a weakness for schnapps.

Kaduk was considered "one of the cruelest, brutalest, most vulgar" of SS men at Auschwitz:

Historian Andrew Roberts in his book The Storm of War recounted Kaduk's practice of handing Jewish children balloons just before they were murdered with a phenol injection to the heart at a rate of ten children per minute.

Kaduk witnessed the mass murder of people in gas chambers, and describing his SS colleagues inserting the Zyklon B gas, he said:

Kaduk is also known for Kaduk's chapel, a tiny tower between the barracks and the main camp of Auschwitz.

Criminal convictions
After Germany's surrender, Kaduk worked in a sugar factory in Löbau. In December 1946 he was recognized by a former prisoner and consequently arrested by a Soviet military patrol. In 1947, a Soviet military tribunal sentenced him to 25 years of hard labour, but he was released in April 1956.

Kaduk then went to West Berlin, working at a hospital as a nurse. Despite his violent reputation at Auschwitz, he earned himself the nickname "Papa Kaduk" among patients.

In July 1959 Kaduk was again arrested and appeared in the Frankfurt Auschwitz Trials where he was one of the main accused. On 19 August 1965 the court sentenced him to life imprisonment for murder in ten cases, and joint murder in at least one thousand cases. Because of the gravity of Kaduk's deeds, the responsible Spruchkammern rejected various pleas for clemency.

While in prison, Kaduk was interviewed as part of a TV documentary about SS men stationed at Auschwitz. When asked about Holocaust denial, Kaduk says:

After the 1984 transfer to open prison (Offener Vollzug), Kaduk was released from the Schwalmstadt prison in 1989 due to health reasons (Haftunfähigkeit). He died in Langelsheim, Harz, as a pensioner in 1997, at the age of 90.

Literature
 Demant, Ebbo (Hg.): Auschwitz — "Direkt von der Rampe weg…" Kaduk, Erber, Klehr: Drei Täter geben zu Protokoll: Hamburg: Rowohlt, 1979 
 Ernst Klee: Das Personenlexikon zum Dritten Reich: Wer war was vor und nach 1945. Fischer-Taschenbuch-Verlag, Frankfurt am Main 2005. 
 Hermann Langbein: Menschen in Auschwitz. Frankfurt am Main, Berlin Wien, Ullstein-Verlag, 1980, .
 Auschwitz-Birkenau State Museum: Auschwitz in den Augen der SS. Oswiecim 1998, .

References

1906 births
1997 deaths
People from Chorzów
German military personnel of World War II
German people convicted of murder
SS non-commissioned officers
Auschwitz concentration camp personnel
People from the Province of Silesia
People convicted of murder by Germany
Prisoners sentenced to life imprisonment by Germany
Romani genocide perpetrators
Waffen-SS personnel
People convicted in the Frankfurt Auschwitz trials
German prisoners of war in World War II held by the Soviet Union